Reza Ostadi Moghaddam (born 1937 in Tehran) is a member of the Expediency Discernment Council and the Assembly of Experts of the Islamic Republic of Iran.  Previously, during the presidency of Mohammad Khatami, he was also a member of the Guardian Council.

While in the Guardian Council in 2000, he confirmed the rejection of 600 candidates out of an original 758 candidates who were running for public office.

Opposition
In July 2009, Ayatollah Ostadi issued a stringing criticism of Ahmadinejad and the 'status quo.'  He announced he will stop leading Friday prayers at Qom Mosque. Ostadi belongs to the hardline Society of Seminary Teachers of Qom.

See also
 List of Ayatollahs

References & notes

Iranian Islamists
Iranian ayatollahs
Shia Islamists
Living people
1937 births
Members of the Expediency Discernment Council
Members of the Guardian Council
Members of the Assembly of Experts
Society of Seminary Teachers of Qom members
People from Tehran